Hercules X-1 (Her X-1), also known as 4U1656+35, is a moderately strong X-ray binary source first studied by the Uhuru satellite.
It is composed of a neutron star accreting matter from a normal star (HZ Her) probably due to Roche lobe overflow.

Intermediate-mass X-ray binary (IMXB)

Her X-1 is the prototype for the massive X-ray binaries although it falls on the borderline, between high- and low-mass X-ray binaries.

An intermediate-mass X-ray binary (IMXB) is a binary star system where one of the components is a neutron star or a black hole. The other component is an intermediate mass star.

Intensity

The source exhibits complex time variability, pulsing with a period of 1.24 s due to the rotation of the neutron star, eclipsing every 1.70 days with the period of the binary orbit, and also varying with a 35-day period believed associated with the precession of the accretion disk. From observations, a twisted accretion disk, in retrograde precession, modulates the X-rays illuminating HZ Her and Earth.

The 1.24 second pulsar period associated with Her X-1 is immediately evident from the data. The sharp cut-off at ~24 keV in the flat spectrum observed for Her X-1 in this exposure provided the first reported evidence for radiative transfer effects to be associated with a highly magnetized plasma near the surface of a neutron star.

Discovery of Her X-1

The actual announcement of the discovery of Hercules X-1 by Uhuru occurred at the 1971-72 Winter Meeting of the High-Energy Astrophysics Division AAS held in San Juan. The original discovery of this periodically pulsating binary X-ray source occurred in November 1971.

Location

The position of Her X-1 was uncertain due to the failure of the Uhuru star aspect sensors, having been reported at J1950 RA 17h05m Dec 34°52' using Uhuru and at 16h56.7m Dec 35°35' using OSO 7. However, there is only one weak X-ray source (2U 1735+43) within 10° of Her X-1. But four radio sources: (1) RA 16h56m50.75s Dec 35°14'33±3" of a double point source separated by 17±2" and a stellar image 13±3" from the centroid, (2) RA 16h57m10.65s Dec 35°21'35±3" within 6±3" of the stellar image, (3) RA 16h57m35.72s Dec 35°15'19±3" with no star visible on the Palomar Sky Survey print, and (4) RA 16h58m39.17s Dec 35°10'53±3" were found near the overlap of Uhuru and OSO 7 positions. At that time the search could not discover the radio counterpart of Her X-1 if its radio emission were analogous to its 36-day periodic X-ray behavior, although there was no compelling astrophysical reason for the two fluxes to be correlated. The four sources above were observed during several eclipse phases of the X-ray star. No radio eclipses were detected that corresponded. At that time Doxsey specified that (1) repeated radio searches, especially during the high X-ray luminosity state of Her X-1, should be made and (2) there was a clear need for a better position determination for Her X-1.

In 1973, Bahcall and Bahcall determined that HZ Herculis had a light curve that matched Hercules X-1's, fixing Hercules X-1's position.

References

Neutron stars
Astronomical X-ray sources
X-ray astronomy
Hercules (constellation)
Herculis, HZ
X-ray binaries